Gyulhyeon station is a subway station on Line 1 of the Incheon Subway in Gyeyang-gu, Incheon, South Korea.

Development
Gyulhyeon area was a green forest with no development. However, 182 pyeong of this area is scheduled to be developed into a "new city." Committee of planning Incheon city permitted to make these area into mini city area by 2010.

Station layout

Vicinity
Exit 1 : Gyeyang Middle School, Gyulhyeon Train Depot

References

Metro stations in Incheon
Seoul Metropolitan Subway stations
Railway stations in South Korea opened in 1999
Gyeyang District